Liv is a live album recorded by the Waltons. According to the insert, it was recorded live on February 23 and 24, 2001 at Ted's Wrecking Yard in Toronto, Ontario, Canada.

Track listing
 Wascana
 Colder Than You
 Soother
 Michaelangelo's Tummy
 Steel In Your Heart
 Naked Rain
 Middle of Nowhere
 Simple Brian
 Cold Rails
 Beats The Hell...
 Tear Stained Eye
 Saskatoon Pie
 In The Mean Time
 End Of The World
 Empire On The Plains
 Bring Everything
 Silver Lining
 Glorious Old Shame

2001 albums
Waltons (band) albums